The Menareh Mosque is related to the Qajar dynasty and is located in Urmia, Imam Street near the Sardar Mosque.

References

Mosques in Iran
Mosque buildings with domes
National works of Iran
Qajar architecture
Buildings and structures in Urmia